Jeremy Doncaster (born 16 June 1961 in Grimsby, England) is a former international motorcycle speedway rider who won the World Team Cup in 1989, top scoring for Great Britain with 13 points. He also finished in third place in the 1989 World Final. Doncaster finished equal on 12 points with countryman Simon Wigg who defeated him in a run-off for second place.

Doncaster spent most of his career with the Ipswich Witches,  but when they dropped to the British League Division Two he moved to Reading Racers where he was twice a member of British League winning teams, in 1990 and 1992. He also rode in the Swedish League for Bysarna. He had also twice won the Golden Helmet of Pardubice (CZE) in 1989 and 1990.

World Final appearances

Individual World Championship
 1987 -  Amsterdam, Olympic Stadium - 6th - 20pts
 1989 -  Munich, Olympic Stadium - 3rd - 12pts + 2pts
 1991 -  Göteborg, Ullevi - 15th - 2pts

World Team Cup
 1985 -  Long Beach, Veterans Memorial Stadium (with Phil Collins / Kelvin Tatum / Richard Knight / John Davis) – 3rd – 13pts (6)
 1986 -  Göteborg, Ullevi,  Vojens, Speedway Center and  Bradford, Odsal Stadium (with Simon Wigg / Neil Evitts / Kelvin Tatum / Chris Morton / Marvyn Cox) - 3rd - 81pts (10)
 1987 -  Fredericia, Fredericia Speedway,  Coventry, Brandon Stadium and  Prague, Marketa Stadium (with Kelvin Tatum / Simon Wigg / Simon Cross / Marvyn Cox)  - 2nd - 101pts (24)
 1989 -  Bradford, Odsal Stadium (with Kelvin Tatum / Paul Thorp / Simon Wigg / Simon Cross) - Winner - 48pts (13)

World Longtrack Championship
Finalist
 1984  Herxheim 11th- 7pts
 1985  Esbjerg 9th - 9pts
 1995  Scheeßel 11th - 9pts 
Grand-Prix Years
 1997 54pts - 10th (Five Rounds)
 1999 42pts - 11th (Five Rounds)
 2001 0pts - =21st (One Round)

European Grasstrack Championship
 1982  Damme Winner
 1983  Nandlastadt 5th

British Grasstrack Championship
500cc
 1980 - Third
 1988 - Third
 1991 - Second
 1992 - Third
 1996 - Third
250cc
 1979 - Second
 1980 - First

References

1961 births
Living people
British speedway riders
English motorcycle racers
Ipswich Witches riders
Reading Racers riders
Individual Speedway Long Track World Championship riders